West Shokan is a hamlet in the town of Olive in Ulster County, New York, United States. West Shokan has a post office with the ZIP code 12494.

References

Hamlets in Ulster County, New York
Hamlets in New York (state)